The Watson-class vehicle cargo ship is a series of vehicle cargo ships, used by the United States for prepositioning of ground vehicles. The class comprises eight of Military Sealift Command's nineteen Large, Medium-Speed Roll-on/Roll-off ships and is one part of the 33 ships involved in the Prepositioning Program.

The class, as with the lead ship, was named for Private George Watson, a Medal of Honor Recipient.
 
Watson was laid down on 23 May 1996, launched on 26 July 1997, and put into service in the Pacific Ocean on 23 June 1998.

Vessels 
 USNS Watson (T-AKR-310)
 USNS Sisler (T-AKR-311)
 USNS Dahl (T-AKR-312)
 USNS Red Cloud (T-AKR-313)
 USNS Charlton (T-AKR-314)
 USNS Watkins (T-AKR-315)
 USNS Pomeroy (T-AKR-316)
 USNS Soderman (T-AKR-317)

References

 
Auxiliary transport ship classes